Svetoslav Savatov (born 24 April 1987) is a Bulgarian footballer currently playing for Vihren Sandanski as a midfielder.

References

External links
 

1987 births
Living people
Bulgarian footballers
OFC Vihren Sandanski players
First Professional Football League (Bulgaria) players
Association football midfielders